The Nebraska Heavyweight Championship was a professional wrestling championship originally sanctioned by the Nebraska office of the National Wrestling Alliance and later the American Wrestling Association.

The title existed from 1959 through 1967, when it was unified with the AWA Midwest Heavyweight Championship.

Title history
Silver areas in the history indicate periods of unknown lineage.

See also
National Wrestling Alliance
American Wrestling Association

References

External links
Wrestling-Titles.com

National Wrestling Alliance championships
Heavyweight wrestling championships
National Wrestling Alliance state wrestling championships
Sports competitions in Omaha, Nebraska
Professional wrestling in Nebraska